The Gun people, also rendered Ogũ, Ogun and Egun, are an ethnic group located majorly in Lagos and Ogun State in southwestern Nigeria, and Ouémé Department in the southeast of the Republic of Benin, who speak the Gun language. The Ogu account for about 15% of the indigenous population of Lagos State and 6% of the total population of the Republic of Benin.

Origin
The Ogu people were settlers in the old Dahomey presently known as Republic of Benin. Oral history has it that the Ogu people are a descendant of those who migrated from Whydah, Allada and Weme which are now part of the Republic of Benin as a result of the Dahomean War that occurred during the 18th century. According to Mesawaku, a historian; the Ogu people migrated to Badagry as early as the 15th century due to the need for security.

Geography and people
The Ogu people are found in Badagry and in the Yewa  and Ipokia region of Ogun State. They are also located in some parts of the Republic of Benin. Since their environment is surrounded by water, majority of Ogu people are into fishing, coconut processing and salt production while some are involved in trading and farming. The people of Ogu strongly believe in their traditions despite most of them being followers of other religions, they are seen worshipping a deity called Zangbeto.(A Nightman) .

The Ogu people share similarities with the Yorubas owing to the fact that during the 17-18th the Dahomey Empire was under the Oyo Empire rule, thus the strengthen relationship between both ethnicities.

Bibliography

References

Ethnic groups in Nigeria
Ethnic groups in Benin